James Paul Scoblick (May 10, 1909 – December 4, 1981) was a Republican member of the U.S. House of Representatives from Pennsylvania.

James P. Scoblick was born in Archbald, Pennsylvania; both of his parents were Italian immigrants.  He graduated from Fordham University in New York City in 1930 and took postgraduate work at Columbia University in New York City.  He served as a member of the Department of Public Assistance Board of Lackawanna County, Pennsylvania.

Scoblick was elected as a Republican to the 79th United States Congress to fill the vacancy caused by the resignation of John W. Murphy and at the same time was elected to the 80th United States Congress.  He was an unsuccessful candidate for renomination in 1948.

He resumed former business pursuits and engaged as consultant to food industry. In January 1953, Scoblick and two of his brothers were indicted in a check kiting scheme involving their fruit-processing business, Scoblick Bros. Inc. With the testimony of a bank cashier who turned state's evidence, all three were convicted on December 3, 1954 and Judge Albert L. Watson sentenced James Scoblick to five years in prison.

Scoblick was a resident of Archbald, until his death there on December 4, 1981, and was interred in Mother of Sorrows Cemetery in Finch Hill, Pennsylvania.

Sources

References

1909 births
1981 deaths
American people convicted of fraud
American people of Italian descent
Columbia University alumni
Fordham University alumni
People from Lackawanna County, Pennsylvania
Republican Party members of the United States House of Representatives from Pennsylvania
20th-century American politicians